Jofré Llançol i Escrivà, (c. 1390 - 1436/37), also known as Jofré de Borja y Escrivà and Jofré de Borja y Doms, was a Spanish noble from Xàtiva, Kingdom of Valencia. He was related by marriage to the Borgia family. He was an uncle of Cardinal Luis Juan del Milà and the father of Pope Alexander VI.

Biography
Jofré Llançol i Escrivà was born in Xàtiva, Kingdom of Valencia, Crown of Aragon, around 1390. He was head of the branch of the House of Borgia that resided on Ventres Street in Xàtiva. He was the son of Rodrigo Gil de Borja y Fennolet, Jurado del Estamento Militar de Xàtiva, and his wife, Sibilia de Escrivà y Pròixita. Jofré died in either 1436 or 1437, in Valencia.

Marriage and Descendants
Jofré Llançol i Escrivà married Isabel de Borja y Cavanilles, who was actually his distant cousin, from Valencia. She was the daughter of Domingo de Borja and his wife, Francina Llançol, and the sister of Alfons de Borja y Cavanilles, who would later go on to become Pope Callixtus III. Isabel  gave birth to 5 children:

 Pere Lluís de Llançol y Borja (b. ? - d. 1458), who became the Marquess of Civitavecchia and Duke of Spoleto
 Roderic de Borja y Borja (b. 1431 - d. 1503), who would later become the Pope
 Joana de Llançol y Borja, who married Pedro Guillén Llançol, 8th Lord of Villalonga
 Tecla de Llançol y Borja (b. ? - d. c. 1462), who married Vidal de Vilanova, Lord of Pego and Murla
 Beatriu de Llançol y Borja, who married Ximen Pérez de Arenós, Lord of Puebla de Arenos.

References

Year of birth missing
14th-century births
1437 deaths
Spanish untitled nobility
House of Borgia